Jean Young may refer to:

 Jean Childs Young (1933–1994), educator and advocate for equal access to education in the United States
 Jean Smith Young (born 1942), American psychiatrist, writer, and civil rights activist